Lingo Township is an inactive township in Macon County, in the U.S. state of Missouri.

Lingo Township has the name of Samuel Lingo, a local judge.

References

Townships in Missouri
Townships in Macon County, Missouri